The Arthur Champlin Spencer and Margaret Fenton Spencer House is a house located in southwest Portland, Oregon listed on the National Register of Historic Places.

See also
 National Register of Historic Places listings in Southwest Portland, Oregon

References

Houses on the National Register of Historic Places in Portland, Oregon
Colonial Revival architecture in Oregon
Houses completed in 1909
1909 establishments in Oregon